Anselmo Pardo Alcaide (1913–1977) was a Spanish entomologist.

Career
Throughout his life he combined his work as a teacher with his entomological studies. He published his first scientific paper in 1936, at 23 years of age, in which he described his first species new to science, Aphodius ambrosi (Coleoptera, Scarabaeidae) in northern Morocco. This article was followed by another 79, in which he described another 145 taxa, mostly Pardo Alcaide became a world authority in families and Melyridae Meloidae- Malachiinae.

He made numerous scientific missions where he collected specimens for study that were particularly important in different regions of Morocco.

Recognition
In 1978 he received posthumously the degree of Commander of the Civil Order of Alfonso X the Wise in recognition of his scientific achievements. In 1979 he gave his name to a new school opened in Melilla, the College of Education and Primary Anselmo Pardo.

References

Spanish entomologists
1913 births
1977 deaths
People from Melilla
20th-century Spanish zoologists